Bergsfjord Church is a parish church of the Church of Norway in Loppa Municipality in Troms og Finnmark county, Norway. It is located in the small, isolated village of Bergsfjord. It is one of the churches in the Loppa parish which is part of the Alta prosti (deanery) in the Diocese of Nord-Hålogaland. The white, wooden church was built in a long church style in 1951 using plans drawn up by the architect Harald Sunde. The church seats about 200 people.

See also
List of churches in Nord-Hålogaland

References

Loppa
Churches in Finnmark
Wooden churches in Norway
20th-century Church of Norway church buildings
Churches completed in 1951
1951 establishments in Norway
Long churches in Norway